Moustique (French: The Mosquito) is a weekly news magazine with a special reference to current affairs, culture and television. It has been in circulation since 1924 and is headquartered in Brussels, Belgium.

History and profile
The magazine was started in 1924 with the name Le Moustique (French: The Mosquito) and became Télémoustique at the end of the 1960s. It is published on a weekly basis. In March 2011 it was relaunched under the name Moustique. It covers news, cultural events and television-related articles.

Moustique was owned by the Sanoma Magazines.

In 2013 Moustique sold 70,000 copies.

References

External links
 

1924 establishments in Belgium
French-language magazines
Magazines established in 1924
Magazines published in Brussels
News magazines published in Belgium
Television magazines
Weekly magazines published in Belgium